Edward Jones-Agnew (1767-1805) was an Irish politician.

Jones-Agnew was educated at Trinity College, Dublin. From 1792 to 1797, he was MP for Antrim County.

References

Alumni of Trinity College Dublin
Irish MPs 1790–1797
Members of the Parliament of Ireland (pre-1801) for County Antrim constituencies
1767 births
1805 deaths